Falkenbergs VBK is a Swedish volleyball club, formed in 1985 by a merger of Ätradalens VK and Köinge JUF. It has played in the highest league (Elitserien) since 2002. It won the league for the first time in 2007. The club reached the final of the Swedish national championship in 2006 and won the national championship for the first time in 2007 before winning again in 2008, 2009., 2011, 2014. and 2016.

References

External links
Official website 

Sport in Falkenberg
Swedish volleyball clubs
1985 establishments in Sweden
Volleyball clubs established in 1985